Heavy ConstruKction is a live three CD set by the band King Crimson, released by Discipline Global Mobile records on November 7, 2000. The album features recordings of the European tour of May to July 2000, from DAT’s made at the front-of-house mixing desk.

King Crimson's 2000 European tour was conducted to promote the studio album The Construkction of Light.  The band members at the time of the tour were the “double duo” quartet of guitarists Robert Fripp and Adrian Belew, Warr guitarist Trey Gunn and drummer Pat Mastelotto. Longtime drummer Bill Bruford had left the group in 1998, and bassist Tony Levin was not included in this particular King Crimson lineup due to other musical commitments.

The third disc features improvisations from different shows, which are often spliced together to create, according to the liner notes, "a cohesive presentation out of a series of incoherent events".

Disc 2 of the album contained video footage, playable with Windows Media Player software. A password was required to access this video footage.

Track listing

Disc 1
"Into the Frying Pan" (Adrian Belew, Robert Fripp, Trey Gunn, Pat Mastelotto) - 6:20
Recorded at: Circus Krone, Munich, Germany, 4 June 2000
"The Construkction of Light" (Belew, Fripp, Gunn, Mastelotto) - 8:29
Recorded at: Museumsplatz, Bonn, Germany, 6 June 2000
"Prozakc Blues" (Belew, Fripp, Gunn, Mastelotto) - 5:25
Recorded at: Olympia, Paris, France, 25 June 2000
"München" (Belew, Fripp, Gunn, Mastelotto) - 8:35
Recorded at: Circus Krone, Munich, Germany, 4 June 2000
"One Time" (Belew, Bill Bruford, Fripp, Gunn, Tony Levin, Mastelotto) - 5:44
Recorded at: Roma, Warsaw, Poland, 11 June 2000
"Dinosaur" (Belew, Bruford, Fripp, Gunn, Levin, Mastelotto) - 5:24
Recorded at: Roma, Warsaw, Poland, 11 June 2000
"VROOOM" (Belew, Bruford, Fripp, Gunn, Levin, Mastelotto) - 4:44
Recorded at: Arena, Poznań, Poland, 9 June 2000
"Frakctured" (Belew, Fripp, Gunn, Mastelotto) - 8:46
Recorded at:
Amager Bio, Copenhagen, Denmark, [27?/28?] May 2000
Museumsplatz, Bonn, Germany, 6 June 2000
"The World's My Oyster Soup Kitchen Floor Wax Museum" (Belew, Fripp, Gunn, Mastelotto) - 7:38
Recorded at: Museumsplatz, Bonn, Germany, 6 June 2000
"Bonn" (Belew, Fripp, Gunn, Mastelotto) - 9:22
Recorded at: Museumsplatz, Bonn, Germany, 6 June 2000

Disc 2
Audio
"Sex Sleep Eat Drink Dream" (Belew, Fripp, Gunn, Mastelotto) - 4:30
Recorded at: Zeleste, Barcelona, Spain, 27 June 2000
"Offenbach" (Belew, Fripp, Gunn, Mastelotto) - 6:30
Recorded at Stadthalle, Offenbach, Germany, 7 June 2000
"Cage" (Belew, Bruford, Fripp, Gunn, Levin, Mastelotto) - 3:54
Recorded at: Stadthalle, Offenbach, Germany, 7 June 2000
"Larks' Tongues in Aspic (Part IV)" (Belew, Fripp, Gunn, Mastelotto) - 12:51
Recorded at: Olympia, Paris, France, 25 June 2000
"Three of a Perfect Pair" (Belew, Bruford, Fripp, Levin) - 3:42
Recorded at: L'Ampiteatro, Gardone Riviera, Italy, 21 June 2000
"The Deception of the Thrush" (Belew, Fripp, Gunn) - 8:26
Recorded at: Shepherds Bush Empire, London, UK, 3 July 2000
"'Heroes'" (David Bowie, Brian Eno) - 6:11
Recorded at: Roma, Warsaw, Poland, 11 June 2000

Video
Recorded at the Città della Musica, Rome, Italy, 23 June 2000
"Rome" (Belew, Fripp, Gunn, Mastelotto)
"Larks' Tongues In Aspic (Part IV)" (Belew, Fripp, Gunn, Mastelotto)
"Cage" (Belew, Bruford, Fripp, Gunn, Levin, Mastelotto)
"The World's My Oyster Soup Kitchen Floor Wax Museum" (Belew, Fripp, Gunn, Mastelotto)
"Sex Sleep Eat Drink Dream" (Belew, Bruford, Fripp, Gunn, Levin, Mastelotto)
"VROOOM" (Belew, Bruford, Fripp, Gunn, Levin, Mastelotto)

Disc 3
"Sapir" (Belew, Fripp, Gunn, Mastelotto) - 5:40
Recorded at:
Olympia, Paris, France, 25 June 2000
Shepherds Bush Empire, London, UK, 3 July 2000
"Blastic Rhino" (Belew, Fripp, Gunn, Mastelotto) - 4:11
Recorded at:
Museumsplatz, Bonn, Germany, 6 June 2000
Archa Theatre, Prague, Czech Republic, 13 June 2000
L'Ampiteatro, Gardone Riviera, Italy, 21 June 2000
La Riviera, Madrid, Spain, 29 June 2000
"Lights Please (Part I)" (Belew, Fripp, Gunn, Mastelotto) - 0:58
Recorded at:
Archa Theatre, Prague, Czech Republic, 13 June 2000
"ccccSeizurecc" (Belew, Fripp, Gunn, Mastelotto) - 6:02
Recorded at:
Stuttgart, Germany, 3 June 2000
Circus Krone, Munich, Germany, 4 June 2000
Arena, Poznań, Poland, 9 June 2000
Piazza Cima, Conegliano Veneto, Italy, 20 June 2000
Citta Della Musica, Rome, Italy, 23 June 2000
Shepherds Bush Empire, London, UK, 3 July 2000
"Off and Back" (Belew, Fripp, Gunn, Mastelotto) - 4:11
Recorded at:
Stadthalle, Offenbach, Germany, 7 June 2000
"More (and Less)" (Belew, Fripp, Gunn, Mastelotto) - 3:14
Recorded at:
Citta Della Musica, Rome, Italy, 23 June 2000
Zeleste, Barcelona, Spain, 27 June 2000
"Beatiful Rainbow" (Belew, Fripp, Gunn, Mastelotto) - 6:59
Recorded at:
Kursaal Palace, San Sebastián, Spain, 28 June 2000
"7 Teas" (Belew, Fripp, Gunn, Mastelotto) - 4:07
Recorded at:
Amager Bio, Copenhagen, Denmark, [27?/28?] May 2000
Circus Krone, Munich, Germany, 4 June 2000
"Tomorrow Never Knew Thela" (Belew, Fripp, Gunn, Mastelotto) - 4:49
including:
"Tomorrow Never Knows" (John Lennon, Paul McCartney)
Recorded at:
Roma, Warsaw, Poland, 10 June 2000
Archa Theatre, Prague, Czech Republic, 13 June 2000
"Uböö" (Belew, Fripp, Gunn, Mastelotto) - 7:59
Recorded at:
La Riviera, Madrid, Spain, 29 June 2000
Shepherds Bush Empire, London, UK, 3 July 2000
"The Deception of the Thrush" (Belew, Fripp, Gunn) - 11:10
Recorded at:
Columbia Halle, Berlin, Germany, 31 May 2000
Citta Della Musica, Rome, Italy, 23 June 2000
Olympia, Paris, France, 25 June 2000
Teatro Kursaal, San Sebastián, Spain, 28 June 2000
"Arena of Terror" (Belew, Fripp, Gunn, Mastelotto) - 3:24
Recorded at: Arena, Poznań, Poland, 9 June 2000
"Lights Please (Part II)" (Belew, Fripp, Gunn, Mastelotto) - 4:55
Recorded at:
Archa Theatre, Prague, Czech Republic, 13 June 2000
La Riviera, Madrid, Spain, 29 June 2000

Personnel
 Robert Fripp – guitar
 Adrian Belew – guitar, vocals
 Trey Gunn – Warr Guitar, Ashbory bass guitar, talker
 Pat Mastelotto – electronic drums

Discs 1 & 2 recorded and mixed by George Glossop, and produced by David Singleton and Alex R. Mundy.  Disc 3 recorded by Ken Latchney, and produced and mixed by Pat Mastelotto and Bill Munyon.

References

2000 live albums
2000 compilation albums
King Crimson compilation albums
King Crimson live albums
Discipline Global Mobile albums